The Banff Park Museum National Historic Site, located in downtown Banff, Alberta, is an exhibition space associated with Banff National Park. The museum was established in 1895 to house an exhibit of taxidermy mounted specimens of animals, plants and minerals associated with the park. The museum building, constructed in  1903 to the design of territorial government engineer John Stocks, is an early example of the rustic style of architecture that was becoming popular in the parks of North America.

In 1896 Norman Bethune Sanson was hired as the museum curator.  Serving until 1932, Sanson was responsible for expanding the collection from eight mammals, 259 birds, a turtle and a variety of mineral and botanical specimens to the present collection of 5000 specimens. The building, described as a "railway pagoda", uses exposed log framing and rustic detailing. It is the oldest building maintained by Parks Canada. The museum was declared a National Historic Site of Canada in 1985 and was classified as historic structure the following year.

From 1905 to 1937 a small zoo operated on the grounds to the rear of the museum, featuring a small collection of animals, many of which were exotic or non-native. At its peak in 1914 there were 36 birds in an aviary and 50 mammals.  The zoo declined in the 1930s, was closed in 1937, and was demolished in 1939. Forty-six animals were donated to the Calgary Zoo at the Banff Zoo's closing, including wolves, lynx, and black, cinnamon and polar bears.

References

External links
 Parks Canada site
 Banff Park Museum at the Alberta Association of Architects

Buildings and structures in Banff, Alberta
Natural history museums in Canada
National Historic Sites in Alberta
Museums established in 1895
Rustic architecture in Canada
Museums in Alberta
Visitor centers